Imanuel Permenas Padwa (born February 12, 1984 in Biak, Papua) is an Indonesian footballer who currently plays for Persiram Raja Ampat.

Honours

Club honors
Persipura Jayapura
Indonesian Inter Island Cup (1): 2011

Sriwijaya
Indonesian Inter Island Cup (1): 2012

References

External links
 Profile at liga-indonesia.co.id
 Profile at Soccerway

1984 births
Living people
Indonesian Christians
Indonesian footballers
People from Biak
Persiwa Wamena players
Persipura Jayapura players
Sriwijaya F.C. players
Persiram Raja Ampat players
Liga 1 (Indonesia) players
Association football midfielders
Sportspeople from Papua